Yollarbaşı  (former İlisira) is a belde (town) in the central district (Karaman) of Karaman Province, Turkey. The population of Yollarbaşı is 1,054 as of 2018. Yollarbaşı is an old settlement. It was probably founded during the Phrygian era. During the Roman era it was a city of Isaura. Although not supported by sources, the town people believe that the town may be Lystra, one of the important cities which Paul the Apostle visited. Modern scholars place the ancient town of Ilistra at or near Yollarbaşı. There are six church ruins in the town. Yollarbaşı is a typical Central Anatolian town where the main economic activity is agriculture.

Future 

According to Sustainable development report prepared by the Ministry of Environment and Forestry (Turkey) the projected population of Yollarbaşı in 2025 is 5500. Only minor revision is needed in the present master plan of the town is for the future expansion.

References

Populated places in Karaman Province
Towns in Turkey
Karaman Central District